

1979

See also
 1979 in Australia
 1979 in Australian television

References

External links 
 Australian film at the Internet Movie Database

1979
Lists of 1979 films by country or language
Films